Group A of the UEFA Women's Euro 2013 consisted of Denmark, Finland, Italy and the host nation Sweden. Matches were staged in Gothenburg and Halmstad from 10–16 July 2013.

Sweden won the group and advanced to the knockout stage along with group runners-up Italy. Denmark progressed as one of the best third-placed teams, but only after a drawing of lots. Finland finished bottom of the group and so were also eliminated from the tournament.

Standings

Italy vs Finland

Sweden vs Denmark

Italy vs Denmark

Finland vs Sweden

Sweden vs Italy

Denmark vs Finland

References

External links
Group A at UEFA's official website

Group A
2013 in Finnish football
Group A
Group A
Group A